There are 16 currently operating colleges and universities based in the U.S. state of Vermont. This figure includes one research university, five master's universities, an art school, a law school, and a number of associate's and baccalaureate colleges. Three institutions chartered in other states offer degree programs at locations in Vermont.

The state's flagship public university is the University of Vermont. The other four public institutions are organized as the Vermont State Colleges system.

The title of "oldest college in Vermont" is shared by three institutions. Middlebury College was chartered in 1800 and is Vermont's oldest operating college and the first institution to grant an academic degree (1802). Castleton University has its roots in successive institutions dating to 1787. The University of Vermont was chartered in 1791 but did not begin instruction until 1800 or grant a degree until 1804.  Vermont's newest college not formed from existing institutions is Landmark College, founded in 1984 to serve students with learning disabilities; it is also the most expensive college in the United States. The state's colleges range in size from the University of Vermont, with 13,548 students, down to SIT Graduate Institute, with 77 students, a graduate school based on experiential education.

All of these schools are accredited by the New England Commission of Higher Education.

Institutions

Out-of-state institutions
Out-of-state schools offering degree programs in Vermont must be approved by the Vermont State Board of Education, with input from the Vermont Higher Education Council, whose members include all the colleges and universities in Vermont.  Several such programs are in operation:
Southern New Hampshire University's School of Education offers graduate programs at a campus in Colchester.
Springfield College offers a human services degree program in St. Johnsbury.

Unaccredited institutions
Two institutions are authorized by the state to offer degrees, but have not been recognized by an accrediting body:
 The Center for Cartoon Studies in White River Junction offers a Masters of Fine Arts program.
 Northeastern Baptist College in Bennington offers bachelor's degrees.

Defunct institutions

See also
 Higher education in the United States
 List of college athletic programs in Vermont
 List of American institutions of higher education

References and notes

General

Specific

External links
Consortium of Vermont Colleges
Department of Education listing of accredited institutions in Vermont

 
Vermont
Colleges and universities